Tillandsia hirta is a species in the genus Tillandsia. This species is native to Bolivia, Peru, and Salta Province in Argentina.

References

hirta
Flora of South America
Plants described in 1984